Live at the Zoom Club is a live album by the band King Crimson, released through the King Crimson Collectors' Club in May 2002, originally recorded on October 13, 1972.

Track listing

Personnel
Bill Bruford - drums
David Cross - violin, flute, mellotron
Robert Fripp - guitar, mellotron
Jamie Muir - percussion
John Wetton - bass guitar, vocals

References

2002 live albums
King Crimson Collector's Club albums